Charles Alfred Byrne (1848 – 1909) was an American journalist and playwright.

Byrne was involved in a number of publications including Truth and The Journalist. He translated the libretto of Debussy's opera Pelléas et Mélisande into English for the Metropolitan Opera.

He was involved in the 1880 Morey letter affair.

References

1848 births
1909 deaths
American newspaper journalists
19th-century American dramatists and playwrights